Hazeus is a genus of gobies, from the family Gobiidae, native to the Red Sea, the Indian Ocean and the northwestern Pacific Ocean.

Species
There are currently three recognized species in this genus:
 Hazeus elati (Goren, 1984) (Eilat sandgoby)
 Hazeus maculipinna (J. E. Randall & Goren, 1993)
 Hazeus otakii D. S. Jordan & Snyder, 1901

References

Gobiidae
Taxa named by David Starr Jordan